McFarlane's Evil Prophecy is a PlayStation 2 action video game released in North America and Europe in 2004.

Story
In the 19th century, the dead are rising from their graves and other chaos is happening all over the world. People fear that the end of the world is coming. A book predicts that an eternal age of darkness on Earth is beginning. Dr. Hans Jaeger summons three of the best monster hunters in the world to fight the evil creatures: Logan the pirate, Delphine the gunslinger, and Sundano, a mystical African warrior. Among the monsters are Dracula, Frankenstein's monster, the werewolf, the mummy, the sea creature, and the voodoo queen.

Gameplay
Players battle creatures based on a line of Todd McFarlane's action figures including classic movie monsters such as Frankenstein's monster and Dracula. The gameplay is similar to that of the Dynasty Warriors series. The visual presentation and monsters are fairly detailed, such as Frankenstein, who carries the corpse of his creator strapped to his back. Bonuses include an art gallery and interviews with creator Todd McFarlane.

Reception

The game received "unfavorable" reviews according to the review aggregation website Metacritic. Game Informer listed the game among the worst horror games of all-time in 2008.

References

2004 video games
Dark fantasy video games
Konami games
PlayStation 2 games
PlayStation 2-only games
Video games scored by Jesper Kyd
Video games developed in the United States